"After" is a song written by the English composer Edward Elgar in 1895, as his Op. 31, No. 1, with the words from a poem by Philip Bourke Marston.

The manuscript is dated 21 June 1895.

The song was first performed by the Irish baritone Harry Plunket Greene in St. James's Hall on 2 March 1900, together with A Song of Flight, Op. 31, No. 2.

Lyrics
A little time for laughter,
  A little time to sing,
  A little time to kiss and cling,
And no more kissing after.

A little while for scheming
  Love's unperfected schemes;
  A little time for golden dreams,
Then no more any dreaming.

A little while 'twas given
  To me to have thy love;
  Now, like a ghost, alone I move
About a ruined heaven.

A little time for speaking
  Things sweet to say and hear;
  A time to seek, and find thee near,
Then no more any seeking.

A little time for saying
  Words the heart breaks to say;
  A short, sharp time wherein to pray,
Then no more need for praying;

But long, long years to weep in,
  And comprehend the whole
  Great grief, that desolates the soul,
And eternity to sleep in.

Recordings
Songs and Piano Music by Edward Elgar has "After" performed by Amanda Pitt (soprano), with David Owen Norris (piano).

References

Banfield, Stephen, Sensibility and English Song: Critical studies of the early 20th century (Cambridge University Press, 1985)

External links

Songs by Edward Elgar
English poems
1895 songs